Far Al Udayn District is a district of the Ibb Governorate, Yemen. As of 2003, the district had a population of 89,011 inhabitants.

References

Districts of Ibb Governorate
Far Al Udayn District